Ilenia Elisa J "Lenny" Sims (born 10 February 2002) is an English cricketer who currently plays for Staffordshire and The Blaze. She plays as a right-arm off break bowler.

Early life
Sims was born on 10 February 2002. She studies at Loughborough University. Her great-great-uncle is former England cricketer Harold Larwood.

Domestic career
Sims made her county debut in 2015, for Staffordshire against Derbyshire. 2018 was her most successful season for the side, as she took 8 wickets at an average of 13.37 in the County Championship, and was the joint-fourth leading wicket-taker across the whole Twenty20 Cup, with 14 wickets at an average of 9.64. This included her maiden county five-wicket haul, taking 5/8 in a Twenty20 against Cumbria. In 2019, Sims took 9 wickets in the County Championship at an average of 12.66, including her List A best bowling figures of 3/15. In 2021, Sims made her Twenty20 high score, hitting 32 opening the batting against Somerset. She took six wickets for Staffordshire in the 2022 Women's Twenty20 Cup, at an average of 23.33.

In 2020, Sims played for Lightning in the Rachael Heyhoe Flint Trophy. She appeared in one match, scoring 1* in a defeat to North West Thunder. After not being included in the Lightning squad in 2021, she returned to the side in 2022, but did not play a match.

References

External links

2002 births
Living people
Place of birth missing (living people)
Staffordshire women cricketers
The Blaze women's cricketers